David Berliner (born 16 February 1976) is a Belgian anthropologist and a professor of anthropology at Université Libre de Bruxelles, Belgium.

Academic career 
Born in Brussels, Berliner holds a PhD in Social and Cultural Anthropology from Brussels (2002) and has been a doctoral visiting student at The University of Manchester and Oxford University. From 2001 to 2003, he completed a postdoctoral fellowship at Harvard University, and has taught at the Central European University, formerly based in Budapest (Hungary). Between 2011 and 2015, he was coeditor of Social Anthropology/Anthropologie Sociale, the journal of the European Association of Social Anthropologists. He has held invited professorships at Ecole des hautes etudes en sciences sociales (in 2017) and at Université de Toulouse II – Le Mirail (in 2010).

He mostly writes about memory, nostalgia (exonostalgia)., temporality, heritage, transmission and cultural loss, but also religion, gender and sexuality. Influenced by Lévi-Strauss, William James, Georges Perec and Donna Haraway, he pursues the project of an anthropology rooted in solid, “thick” empiricism and balancing smoothly between hermeneutical understanding and scientific modes of explanation; an anthropology that is capable of accounting for the ways individuals “arrive at” cultural concepts, representations, practices and emotions. This implies an intellectual commitment to issues of learning, transmission and socialization, and interdisciplinary connections with cognitive psychology, psychoanalysis, linguistics and fiction.

His main areas of geographic experience are West Africa and Southeast Asia. He has conducted ethnographic research in Guinea Conakry, Burkina Faso, Gabon and, more recently in Laos, Romania and Belgium.

Berliner has published blog posts aimed at popularising anthropology. He is a frequent contributor of newspapers pieces in Belgium and France. He has also written about the neoliberal ethos in contemporary academia.

His book "Perdre sa culture" (éditions Zones Sensibles) has been awarded the Prix Scam Essai 2019.

In 2022, David Berliner has announced that he published a series of short fiction pieces under the pseudonym Derek Moss, for example "An anthropologist for dinner" https://culanth.org/fieldsights/an-anthropologist-for-dinner and "A desire for traces" https://www.otherwisemag.com/traces.

Selected publications 
2022    Devenir Autre. Hétérogénéité et plasticité du soi. Paris: Editions La Découverte.

2020 	(with Olivia Angé) Ecological Nostalgias: Memory, Affect and Creativity in Times of Ecological Upheavals. London/New York: Berghahn Books.

2020	Losing Culture. Heritage, nostalgia and Our Accelerated Times. New Brunswick : Rutgers University Press.

2018	Perdre sa culture. Bruxelles : Editions Zones Sensibles.

2016	(with Christoph Brumann) World Heritage on the Ground. Ethnographical Perspectives. London/New York: Berghahn Books.

2014	(with Olivia Angé) Anthropology and Nostalgia. London/New York : Berghahn Books.

2013	Mémoires religieuses Baga. Paris : Somogy.

2013	(with Mattjis Van de Port and Laurent Legrain). Latour and the Anthropology of the Moderns. Social Anthropology/Anthropologie Sociale 21(4): 435–447.

2012 	Multiple Nostalgias : the Fabric of Heritage in Luang Prabang (Lao PDR). JRAI 18(4): 769–786.

2008	(with Douglas Falen). Speaking of Women: Men Doing Anthropology of Women. Men and Masculinities 11. Special issue.

2007 	(with Ramon Sarro). Learning Religion: Anthropological Approaches. Oxford/NY : Berghahn Books.

2005	An « Impossible » Transmission. Youth Religious Memories in Guinea-Conakry. American Ethnologist 32(4): 576–592.

2005	The Abuses of Memory. Reflections on the Memory Boom in Anthropology. Anthropological Quarterly 78(1): 183–197.

References 

Living people
1976 births
Belgian anthropologists
Anthropologists